Perch Creek is a  long 2nd order tributary to the Elk River in Cecil County, Maryland.

Variant names
According to the Geographic Names Information System, it has also been known historically as:  
Perch Creek Run
Thomas Branch

Course
Perch Creek rises on the Belltown Run divide at Melody Meadows in New Castle County, Delaware.  Perch Creek then flows southwest into Maryland to meet the Elk River at Old Frenchtown Wharf, Maryland.

Watershed
Perch Creek drains  of area, receives about 46.0 in/year of precipitation, has a topographic wetness index of 512.53 and is about 25.9% forested.

See also
List of rivers of Delaware

References 

Rivers of Delaware
Rivers of Maryland
Rivers of New Castle County, Delaware
Rivers of Cecil County, Maryland